Nick Williams (born February 21, 1990) is an American football defensive tackle for the New York Giants of the National Football League (NFL). He was drafted by the Pittsburgh Steelers in the seventh round of the 2013 NFL Draft after his college football career at Samford. He also played for the Kansas City Chiefs, Miami Dolphins, Chicago Bears, and Detroit Lions.

Early years 
Williams was a lightly recruited player out of Minor High School in Birmingham, Alabama, having played basketball for two years before switching to football in his senior year. At Samford, Williams was red-shirted as a freshman in 2008 and then saw two years of backup duties from 2009 to 2010. In 2011, Williams earned a starting position, notching 23 tackles and three tackles for loss over all eleven games. Williams improved on his performance in 2012, accumulating 31 tackles, eight for a loss, six sacks, and a blocked kick while starting all eleven games.

Professional career

Pittsburgh Steelers
Williams was selected in the seventh round with the 223rd overall pick in the 2013 NFL Draft by the Pittsburgh Steelers. On August 25, 2013, he was placed on the Steelers' injured reserve list. He was released by the Steelers on August 30, 2014 and was signed to the team's practice squad the next day.

Kansas City Chiefs
On November 24, 2014, Williams was signed by the Kansas City Chiefs off the Steelers' practice squad. He was re-signed by the team on April 18, 2016. He was released on October 18, 2016.

Miami Dolphins
On October 19, 2016, Williams was signed by the Miami Dolphins. He was released on September 2, 2017.

Chicago Bears 
On April 19, 2018, Williams was signed by the Chicago Bears. He re-signed with the team on a one-year contract on March 15, 2019.

In 2019, Williams recorded his first career sack against the Denver Broncos on Joe Flacco.
In week 4 against the Minnesota Vikings, Williams sacked Kirk Cousins twice and recovered a fumble forced by Khalil Mack in the 16-6 win.

Detroit Lions
On March 24, 2020, Williams signed a two-year, $10 million contract with the Detroit Lions.

New York Giants
On July 26, 2022, the New York Giants signed Williams. On November 7, 2022, Williams was placed on injured reserve with a bicep injury.

References

External links 
 Steelers.com roster entry
 Samford Bio

1990 births
Living people
American football defensive ends
Samford Bulldogs football players
Chicago Bears players
Detroit Lions players
Kansas City Chiefs players
Miami Dolphins players
New York Giants players
Pittsburgh Steelers players
Players of American football from Birmingham, Alabama
People from Adamsville, Alabama
Brian Piccolo Award winners